Gmina Józefów is an urban-rural gmina (administrative district) in Biłgoraj County, Lublin Voivodeship, in eastern Poland.

The gmina contains parts of the protected areas called Krasnobród Landscape Park and Puszcza Solska Landscape Park.

Villages
Apart from the town of Józefów, Gmina Józefów contains the villages and settlements of Borowina, Brzeziny, Czarny Las-Kolonia, Długi Kąt, Florianka, Górecko Kościelne, Górecko Stare, Hamernia, Majdan Kasztelański, Majdan Nepryski, Samsonówka, Siedliska, Stanisławów, Szopowe and Tarnowola.

Neighbouring gminas
Gmina Józefów is bordered by the gminas of Aleksandrów, Krasnobród, Łukowa, Susiec, Tereszpol and Zwierzyniec.

References
Polish official population figures 2006

Jozefow
Biłgoraj County